Red, White and Blue Blood is a 1917 American silent comedy film, directed by Charles Brabin. It stars Francis X. Bushman, Beverly Bayne, and Adella Barker, and was released on December 24, 1917.

Cast list
 Francis X. Bushman as John Spaulding
 Beverly Bayne as Helen Molloy-Smythe
 Adella Barker as Mrs. Molloy-Smythe
 William H. Tooker as Patrick Spaulding
 Duncan McRae as Count Jules Berratti
 Cecil Fletcher as Bob Molloy-Smythe
 Jack Raymond as Light-fingered Bertie
 C. R. McKinney as Charlie Jadwin
 Arthur Housman

References

External links 
 
 
 

Films directed by Charles Brabin
Metro Pictures films
1917 comedy films
1917 films
Silent American comedy films
American black-and-white films
American silent feature films
1910s English-language films
1910s American films